To Hell and Black is the debut and only studio album by American hip hop group Capital Punishment Organization. It was released through Capitol Records on August 7, 1990, and featured its two lead singles "Ballad of a Menace" and "This Beat Is Funky". The album peaked at No. 33 on the Billboard Top R&B/Hip-Hop Albums chart.

Audio production of the album was handled by M.C. Ren with co-production by CPO's Young D.

Track listing 

Samples

 "Ballad Of A Menace" contains samples from  
 "Joy" by Isaac Hayes (1973) 
 "Kool Is Back" by Funk, Inc. (1971) 
 "I Ain't Tha 1" by N.W.A (1988)
 "C.P.Osis" contains samples from  
 "Shaft in Africa (Addis)" by Johnny Pate (1973)
 "Get Up Offa That Thing" by James Brown (1976)
 "Ren's Rhythm" contains samples from 
 "I Walk On Gilded Splinters" by Johnny Jenkins (1970)
 "Flow To The Rhythm" contains samples from 
 "Funky Drummer" by James Brown (1970)
 "Save The World" by Southside Movement (1974)
 "El Shabazz" by LL Cool J (1985)
 "The Wall" contains samples from 
 "Funk Funk" by Cameo (1977)
 "Homicide" contains samples from 
 "Got To Get My Hands On Some Lovin'" by The Undisputed Truth (1975)
 "Get Three Coffins Ready" from A Fistful of Dollars (1964)
 "Somethin' Like Dis" contains samples from 
 "Rockit" by Herbie Hancock (1983)
 "Make It Good To Yourself" by James Brown (1973)
 "La Di Da Di" by Doug E. Fresh and Slick Rick (1985)
 "Funky President (People It's Bad)" by James Brown (1974)
 "Funky Drummer" by James Brown (1970)
 "The Movement" contains samples from 
 "I Wouldn't Change A Thing" by Coke Escovedo (1976)
 "I Know You Got Soul" by Bobby Byrd (1971)
 "Move The Crowd" by Eric B. & Rakim (1987)
 "UFO" by ESG (1981)
 "The Big Beat" by Billy Squier (1980)
 "This Beat Is Funky" contains samples from 
 "Money (Dollar Bill Y'all)" by Jimmy Spicer (1983)
 "Sucker M.C.'s (Krush Groove 1)" by Run-D.M.C. (1983)
 "Funky President (People It's Bad)" by James Brown (1974)
 "Gangsta Melody" contains samples from  
 "A Joyful Process" by Funkadelic
 "Put Your Love (In My Tender Care)" by The Fatback Band (1975)
 "Papa Was Too" by Joe Tex (1966)

Personnel
Caroline Greyshock - photography
Vince Edwards - rap vocals, main artist
Jerry Heller - management
Clarence "D.J. Train" Lars - scratches, main artist
Granville "The Chip" Moton - featured artist (track 3)
Lorenzo Patterson - producer, featured artist
Daron "Young D" Sapp - co-producer, main artist
Donovan "The Dirt Biker" Smith - mixing
Tommy Steele - art direction

References 

1990 debut albums
CPO (group) albums
Capitol Records albums